Albert Schönhofer (died 1493) was a Roman Catholic prelate who served as Auxiliary Bishop of Passau (1473–1493).

Biography
On 17 May 1473, Albert Schönhofer was appointed during the papacy of Pope Sixtus IV as Auxiliary Bishop of Passau and Titular Bishop of Salona. On 30 May 1473, he was consecrated bishop by Šimun Vosić, Archbishop of Bar, with Alfonso de Paradinas, Bishop of Ciudad Rodrigo, and Gabriele Maccafani, Bishop of Marsi, serving as co-consecrators.  He served as Auxiliary Bishop of Passau until his death on 7 July 1493.

References

External links and additional sources
 (for Chronology of Bishops) 
 (for Chronology of Bishops) 

15th-century Roman Catholic bishops in Bavaria
Bishops appointed by Pope Sixtus IV
1493 deaths